The Halesi-Maratika Caves (also the Haleshi Mahadev temple) are located next to the village of Mahadevasthan, in the Khotang District of eastern Nepal, 3,100 ft. – 4,734 ft. above sea level. The cave and temple are about 185 km south west of Mount Everest. The temple is a venerated pilgrimage site for Hindus,  Buddhists and Kirat. The caves are called the Halesi Mahadev Temple by Hindus who associate them with Mahadeva, a form of Shiva; while they are known as the sacred place to Buddhists, who consider them to be the caves associated with the legend of Padmasambhava. The  Kirati Rai   of the region worship Halesi as an ancestral deity of the community. The Kirat mundhum, a rich oral tradition of the Kirats, manifests that their ancestor Raechhakule (Khokchilipa) also known as Hetchhakuppa used to stay inside the Halesi cave in the remote past. For that reason, the Kirat/Rais consider Halesi as their ancestral place.

Geology and environment
This cave is 67 feet below the surface.  It is a tourist destination. Its entrance is shaped as a half moon and faces towards the east. It has a round shape, with a diameter of 193 feet, with another, separate, cave lying beneath. The floor is 223 feet in circumference. The location of this cave lies between the holy rivers Dudh Koshi and Sun Kosi. This place is usually cold and rainy. Nowadays it is accessible by motorcycles and jeeps.

History
The caves of Halesi-Maratika are referred to in Himalayan literature as far back as the 12th century. Kathang Zanglingma, a biography of Padmasambhava, a terma revealed and transmitted by Nyangrel Nyima Ozer, describes the original events which made the Maratika caves a sacred place for Vajrayana practitioners.

Religious significance

The most famous natural cave in Khotang District is said to have been the abode of Mahadeva while hiding away from the monster Bhasmasur.  It is an important pilgrimage centre located in east Nepal for both Hindus and Buddhist.  The cave is nicknamed 'the Pashupatinath of the east'.  Well attended religious fairs are observed here on Shivaratri and Bala Chaturdashi.

In Buddhism
Mandarava and Padmasambhava realised a number of terma that had been elementally encoded in the cave by dakini Sangwa Yeshe.  These terma number among the longevity teachings of Buddha Amitabha, and were given at the behest of Bodhisattva Avalokiteswara.  It is here, at the cave, that Mandarava and Padmasambhava attained the Vidyadhara of longevity (or long life).

In Hinduism
Hindus from India come to visit here after climbing many hills. Many people come here from places like Ladania and Jayanagar during the month of Shrawan to pray to Haleshi Mahadev. It is believed that Lord Shiva hid from the demon Bhasmasur for 6,000 years in this cave.

During the holidays of Bhasmasur, Rama Navami, and Ganesh Chaturthi, fairs and festivities are held in the area.

References

Works cited

External links

Tibetan Buddhist places
Padmasambhāva
Buddhist caves
Shiva temples in Nepal
Hindu cave temples in Nepal
Buildings and structures in Khotang District